Applied engineering education is defined as a program that generally prepares individuals to apply mathematical and scientific principles inherent to engineering to the management and design of systems, execution of new product designs, improvement of manufacturing processes, and the management and direction of the physical or technical functions of an organization. Includes instruction in basic engineering principles, project management, industrial processes, production and operations management, systems integration and control, quality control, and statistics.14.0103 2020 CIP Code

On completion of an applied engineering program, students will demonstrate the following management competencies that clearly distinguish them from traditional engineering graduates:

• Use appropriate statistical techniques in variable and attribute control charts and in sampling tables for continuous improvement.

• Evaluate and/or implement total quality systems in industry.

• Perform production scheduling, develop and monitor an inventory control system, utilize appropriate production planning techniques, and identify and exhibit key factors in project management.

• Exhibit knowledge of federal and state safety legislation and identify the role of management in an industrial safety program.

• Recognize, evaluate and control varied industrial health and safety hazards.

• Demonstrate knowledge of traditional management functions and practices, including applications and limitations of various management schemes.

• Solve problems in typical industrial organizations, work effectively in teams, and demonstrate knowledge of the managed area of an industrial enterprise.

• Apply business, marketing and economic principles to solve problems.

• Identify responsibility of supervision and management within various industries.

• Demonstrate communication skills, safe and efficient individual and group work habits, leadership within groups and an attitude of cooperation and tolerance.

Applied engineering students specialize with a technical area of study and blend hands-on process experience with theory. Examples of these technical specialties include: automation/robotics, aviation, computer aided drafting & design, electro-mechanical, electronics, construction, graphic communications, manufacturing, nanofabrication.

Applied engineers are employed in a large and wide array of industries including: manufacturing, architecture, construction, transportation, healthcare, printing/publishing and distribution. They are responsible for implementing a design or process improvement. Although a degree in applied engineering is not considered a traditional design engineering degree (those eligible to sit for the Professional Engineering Examination), it is quite common for employers to hire applied engineering and technology graduates with the term "engineer" in their job titles. Examples of the use of Applied Engineering titles include: applications engineers, control engineers, manufacturing engineers, field engineer, process engineers, product engineers, safety engineers, and sales engineers.

Graduates of applied engineering programs are frequently found in management positions due to their coursework, training and experience in Mathematics, economics, statistics, financial accounting, operations management, quality management, industrial safety, and supervision. Common management-related titles may also include: engineering managers, construction managers, team leaders, plant managers, project managers, supervisors, technical managers.

Applied engineers are prepared to take an engineering design and see it through implementation and execution. They wear many hats in industry, commanding the necessary resources and personnel to contribute to an organization's bottom line.There is no clear distinction made between engineer or applied engineering as in most jobs in industry, the degree or course of study is applied engineering, the career is engineering.

Accreditation and Certification 

The Association of Technology, Management, and Applied Engineering (ATMAE), accredits selected collegiate programs in applied engineering. An instructor or graduate of an applied engineering program may choose to become a certified technology manager (CTM) by sitting for a rigorous exam administered by ATMAE covering production planning and control, safety, quality, and management/supervision.

ATMAE program accreditation is recognized by the Council for Higher Education Accreditation (CHEA) for accrediting Applied Engineering programs. CHEA recognizes ATMAE in the US for accrediting associate, baccalaureate, and master's degree programs in technology, applied technology, engineering technology, and technology-related disciplines delivered by national or regional accredited institutions in the United States.(2011)

References 

Retrieved on December 18, 2019: https://nces.ed.gov/ipeds/cipcode/cipdetail.aspx?y=56&cipid=93052
Retrieved on December 18, 2019: https://nces.ed.gov/ipeds/cipcode/cipdetail.aspx?y=56&cipid=93053

Engineering education